Arthrorhaphis is a genus of lichen-forming fungi in the monotypic family Arthrorhaphidaceae. It has 13 species. The genus was circumscribed by Theodor Magnus Fries in 1860. The family was proposed by lichenologists Josef Poelt and Josef Hafellner in 1976. Species in this family have a widespread distribution in temperate and montane habitats. They grow symbiotically with green algae, or parasitically on other lichens. The family Arthrorhaphidaceae has an uncertain taxonomic placement in the class Lecanoromycetes; that is, it is incertae sedis with respect to ordinal placement.

Species
Arthrorhaphis aeruginosa 
Arthrorhaphis alpina 
Arthrorhaphis anziana 
Arthrorhaphis arctoparmeliae 
Arthrorhaphis citrinella 
Arthrorhaphis grisea 
Arthrorhaphis muddii 
Arthrorhaphis olivaceae 
Arthrorhaphis phyllobaeis 
Arthrorhaphis summorum 
Arthrorhaphis vacillans 
Arthrorhaphis viridescens

References

Lecanoromycetes
Lichen genera
Lecanoromycetes genera
Taxa described in 1860
Taxa named by Theodor Magnus Fries